Georgia Xenofontos (born 11 June 1993) is a Cypriot footballer who plays as a forward for First Division club Geroskipou and the Cyprus women's national team.

References

1993 births
Living people
Cypriot women's footballers
Women's association football forwards
Cyprus women's international footballers